Korosko was a settlement on the Nile River in Egyptian Nubia. The "Korosko route" or "Korosoko road" was in use during the period of the New Kingdom (1550–1077 BC), when Pharaohs Thutmose I and Thutmose III marked it with boundary stelae. During the Meroitic period it was the main connection between the Kingdom of Kush and the Mediterranean world.

Korosko was only replaced in this function by Wadi Halfa after the construction of the Sudan Military Railroad during the 1890s amid the Mahdi War. Although the railway employed a different gauge and was not connected to the Egyptian system, the two networks were connected directly by steamboat and Korosko, between them, diminished in importance.

Its former location was flooded by Lake Nasser upon the completion of the Aswan High Dam.

See also
 The Tragedy of the Korosko, a novel by Arthur Conan Doyle

References

External links
W. V. Davies, P. Ruffieux and Mahmoud Suliman Bashir. The Korosko Road Project. Sudan & Nubia, No 18. The Sudan Archaeological Research Society, 2014. Published online 25 January 2017.

Former populated places in Sudan
Lake Nasser